Abdurrahman Abdi Pasha ("Abdi" was his pen name; born 1630 – died March 1692), was an Ottoman official and historian. He served as kubbe veziri and as governor of several provinces, and functioned as the official court historian (vakanüvis) of Mehmed IV (1648–1687). Abdurrahman Abdi wrote an account of events covering 1648–1682, known as the Tarikh-e Neshanji Abdurrahman Pasha. Aburrahman Abdi also wrote poetry and was the author of commentaries on Attar of Nishapur's Pandnameh and on the poems of 'Orfi Shirazi.

Notes

Sources
 
 
 
 
 
 

1630 births
1692 deaths
17th-century writers from the Ottoman Empire
Governors of the Ottoman Empire